TPCC may refer to:

 Transaction Processing Performance Council, a computer benchmarking industry group
 Taiwan Provincial Consultative Council, a former council in the Republic of China
 Telangana Pradesh Congress Committee, a state unit of the Indian National Congress in India